Welinton Macedo dos Santos (born June 30, 1999), simply known as Welinton, is a Brazilian footballer who plays as a forward for Ferroviária.

Life and career
Welinton Macedo dos Santos was born in Taguaí, São Paulo on June 30, 1999. In his native city, he used to run the 100-meter dash and has great speed despite being 1,83 height. Welinton started his career in the Paraná Soccer Technical Center (PSTC) youth team before passing through the youth ranks of Atlético Mineiro and Athletico Paranaense. In 2019, he signed with Cruzeiro in order to play the Campeonato Brasileiro Sub-20. After some good performances with the U20 team, Welinton was promoted, by coach Mano Menezes, to Cruzeiro senior team. On July 27, 2019, he made his professional debut in the Campeonato Brasileiro, replacing Maurício at the 69th minute of the match against Athletico Paranaense.

References

External links
 
 Player's Profile at Cruzeiro

1999 births
Living people
Brazilian footballers
Association football forwards
Campeonato Brasileiro Série A players
Campeonato Brasileiro Série B players
Cruzeiro Esporte Clube players
Associação Atlética Internacional (Limeira) players
Grêmio Esportivo Brasil players